The 1981 Labatt Brier, the Canadian men's curling championship was held from March 1 to 8, 1981 at the Halifax Metro Centre in Halifax, Nova Scotia. The total attendance for the week was 67,257.

Team Manitoba, who was skipped by Kerry Burtnyk won the Brier tankard as they defeated Northern Ontario, skipped by Al Hackner in the final 5–4. Manitoba advanced to the final after beating Saskatchewan in the semifinal 5–4. This was Manitoba's twenty-first Brier championship and the first of two skipped by Burtnyk.

The Burtynk rink would go onto represent Canada in the 1981 Air Canada Silver Broom, the men's world curling championship on home soil in London, Ontario where they lost in the semifinal to eventual champion Switzerland.

Teams
The teams were listed as follows:

Round-robin standings
Final Round Robin standings

Round-robin results
All draw times are listed in Atlantic Standard Time (UTC-04:00).

Draw 1
Sunday, March 1, 2:00 pm

Draw 2
Sunday, March 1, 8:00 pm

Draw 3
Monday, March 2, 9:30 am

Draw 4
Monday, March 2, 2:30 pm

Draw 5
Monday, March 2, 8:00 pm

Draw 6
Tuesday, March 3, 9:30 am

Draw 7
Tuesday, March 3, 2:30 pm

Draw 8
Tuesday, March 3, 8:00 pm

Draw 9
Wednesday, March 4, 9:30 am

Draw 10
Wednesday, March 4, 2:30 pm

Draw 11
Wednesday, March 4, 8:00 pm

Draw 12
Thursday, March 5, 2:30 pm

Draw 13
Thursday, March 5, 8:00 pm

Draw 14
Friday, March 6, 9:30 am

Draw 15
Friday, March 6, 2:30 pm

Tiebreakers
Ontario was awarded the bye into the second tiebreaker round based on head-to-head victories over both British Columbia and Saskatchewan in the round robin.

Round 1
Friday, March 6, 8:00 pm

Round 2
Saturday, March 7, 9:30 am

Playoffs

Semifinal
Saturday, March 7, 3:30 pm

Final
Sunday, March 8, 3:00 pm

Statistics

Top 5 player percentages
Final Round Robin Percentages

Awards

All-Star Team 
The media selected the following curlers as All-Stars.

Ross G.L. Harstone Award
The Ross Harstone Award was presented to the player chosen by their fellow peers as the curler who best represented Harstone's high ideals of good sportsmanship, observance of the rules, exemplary conduct and curling ability.

References

Labatt Brier
1981
Curling competitions in Halifax, Nova Scotia
Labatt Brier
Labatt Brier